The Beneš-Mráz Be.252 Beta-Scolar was an aerobatic aircraft manufactured in Czechoslovakia shortly before World War II.  Based on the Beneš-Mráz Beta-Minor, it had a structure considerably strengthened for aerobatics and a more powerful radial engine in place of the Beta-Minor's inline engine.

Variants
 Be.252C Beta-Scolar

Specifications

See also

Notes

References

 
 
 Němeček, V. (1968). Československá letadla. Praha: Naše Vojsko.

1930s Czechoslovakian sport aircraft
Beneš-Mráz aircraft
Low-wing aircraft
Single-engined tractor aircraft
Aircraft first flown in 1937
Aerobatic aircraft